Robinsonia is a genus of moths in the family Erebidae. The genus was erected by Augustus Radcliffe Grote in 1866.

Species

Robinsonia banghaasi Rothschild, 1911
Robinsonia bartolana Laguerre & Espinoza, 2006
Robinsonia boliviana Seitz, 1921
Robinsonia cajali (Hoffmann, 1934)
Robinsonia catasticta Hampson, 1916
Robinsonia deiopea H. Druce, 1895
Robinsonia dewitzi Gundlach, 1881
Robinsonia evanida Schaus, 1905
Robinsonia exprata (Dognin, 1921)
Robinsonia flavicorpus Dognin, 1910
Robinsonia flavomarginata H. Druce, 1899
Robinsonia fogra Schaus, 1895
Robinsonia formula Grote, [1866]
Robinsonia irregularis Rothschild, 1917
Robinsonia klagesi Rothschild, 1910
Robinsonia lefaivrei Schaus, 1895
Robinsonia longimacula Schaus, 1915
Robinsonia marginata Rothschild, 1909
Robinsonia mera (Schaus, 1910)
Robinsonia milesi Rothschild, 1922
Robinsonia morula H. Druce, 1906
Robinsonia mossi (Rothschild, 1922)
Robinsonia multimaculata Rothschild, 1909
Robinsonia polyplagia Schaus, 1901
Robinsonia praphoea Dognin, 1906
Robinsonia punctata Rothschild, 1909
Robinsonia rockstonia Schaus, 1905
Robinsonia sabata H. Druce, 1895
Robinsonia sanea H. Druce, 1895
Robinsonia similis Rothschild, 1909
Robinsonia spitzi (Rothschild, 1933)
Robinsonia suffusa Rothschild, 1909
Robinsonia valerana Schaus, 1933
Robinsonia willingi Travassos, 1964

References

 
Phaegopterina
Moth genera